Araguaia may refer to: 

Araguaia River, the main tributary of the Tocantins River
Araguaia National Park, a protected area in Brazilian state of Tocantins
Araguaia Atlético Clube, Brazilian football team from Alto Araguaia, Mato Grosso
Araguaia Palace, seat of Tocantins government
Araguaia (TV series), 2010 Rede Globo television series
The Araguaia Guerrilla War